Vance Brand Airport  is a city-owned public-use airport located three nautical miles (6 km) southwest of the central business district of Longmont, in Boulder County, Colorado, United States. The Airport is named after former NASA astronaut Vance Brand.

Although many U.S. airports use the same three-letter location identifier for the FAA and IATA, this facility is assigned LMO by the FAA but has no designation from the IATA (which assigned LMO to RAF Lossiemouth in Lossiemouth, Scotland).

Facilities and aircraft 

It has one runway designated 11/29 with a concrete surface measuring 4,800 by 75 feet (1,463 x 23 m).

For the 12-month period ending August 28, 2008, the airport had 99,990 aircraft operations, an average of 273 per day: 99.9% general aviation and <0.1% military. At that time there were 281 aircraft based at this airport: 84% single-engine, 7% multi-engine, 1% jet, 3% helicopter and 6% ultralight.

History 

The airport was originally opened October 28, 1945, as Longmont Municipal Airport. The airport was renamed to Vance Brand Airport in October 1988.

References

External links 
 Vance Brand Municipal Airport at City of Longmont web site
 Vance Brand Municipal Airport at Colorado DOT web site
 
 
 Longmont Airport Facebook page

Airports in Colorado
Transportation buildings and structures in Boulder County, Colorado